Boulanouare is a town in Khouribga Province, Béni Mellal-Khénifra, Morocco. According to the 2004 census it has a population of 10,469.

References

Populated places in Khouribga Province